Akwasi Dayo Sarpong is a Ghanaian journalist and presenter of current affairs with the British Broadcasting Corporation.

References

Living people
Ghanaian journalists
Alumni of the Accra Academy
Year of birth missing (living people)